Northcote Cricket Club, nicknamed the Dragons, is an Australian cricket team competing in the Victorian Premier Cricket competition. The club was formed in the mid-1870s and joined the Premier Cricket competition in 1907. They have won 5 1st XI premierships in 1911/12, 1965-66, 1973/74, 1986/87 and 1996/97. The Dragons play home games at Bill Lawry Oval in Northcote.

Notable players 

Bill Lawry                     
Rodney Hogg
Mick Lewis
Albert Hartkopf
Marcus Stoinis
Matthew Short

Northcote CC young up-and-comer, Jack Lalor, has made appearances for the Victorian Second XI in the 21/22 and 22/23 seasons.

See also
 The 1965-66 Victorian District Cricket final

References

Cricket clubs established in 1996
Victorian Premier Cricket clubs
Cricket clubs in Melbourne
1996 establishments in Australia
Sport in the City of Darebin